Douglas H. Ring (March 28, 1907 in Montana – September 8, 2000 in Red Bank, New Jersey) was one of the Bell Labs engineers that invented the cell phone. The history of cellular phone technology began on December 11, 1947 with an internal memo written by Douglas H. Ring in which he proposed development of a cellular telephone system by AT&T.

Although Martin Cooper of Motorola is considered the inventor of the first handheld cellular telephone and the first person to demonstrate to reporters a handheld cell phone call, Cooper's April 1973 call used cellular telephone technology invented and developed by Bell Labs engineers.

See also
 History of mobile phones
 W. Rae Young
 Amos E. Joel, Jr.

References

Patents of Douglas H. Ring
  -- Volume Control Circuits, filed May 26, 1934
  -- Oscillation Generator, filed Apr 22, 1938
  -- Multiple Unit Steerable Antenna System, filed July 14, 1939
  -- Frequency Adjustment of Resonant Cavities, filed Sep 3, 1941
  -- Microwave Coupling System, filed Mar 26, 1942
  -- Microwave Transmission System, filed Dec 23, 1942
  -- Guided Wave Frequency Range, filed Dec 30, 1948
  -- Reduction of Phase Distortion, filed Aug 20, 1949
  -- Microwave Frequency Structure Using Hybrid Junctions, filed Mar 6, 1951
  -- Reduction of Phase Distortion, filed Sep 21, 1951
  -- Frequency Stabilized Oscillator, filed Oct 1, 1953
  -- High Speed Microwave Switching Networks, filed May 31, 1960

External links
1947 memo by Douglas H. Ring proposing hexagonal cells 
AT&T article on mobile and cellular phone history
The history of cellular telephones
 Ring Family history

Further reading
 Brodsky, Ira. "The History of Wireless: How Creative Minds Produced Technology for the Masses" (Telescope Books, 2008)

1907 births
2000 deaths
20th-century American engineers
20th-century American inventors